Rune Ertsås (born 24 May 1987) is a retired Norwegian footballer who last played as a forward for Steinkjer. He has previously played in Tippeligaen for Molde and Sandefjord.

Career
The young Norwegian striker was bought by Molde from Steinkjer in 2006. Ertsås was loaned out from Molde loaned to Sandefjord in the first half of the 2010-season, and scored the match-winning goal when Sandefjord won 2-1 against Molde on 21 March 2010. On 5 August 2010 he signed a two-year deal with Vejle. In March 2012, Ertsås signed with Norwegian First Division side Alta after being released from his contract with Vejle. He scored six goals in 20 matches for Alta during the 2012 season, when the team was relegated from the First Division. Ahead of the 2013 season, Ertsås signed a two-year contract with Hødd.

He retired after the 2017 season.

Career statistics

References

External links 
  National Caps

1987 births
Living people
People from Steinkjer
Norwegian footballers
Molde FK players
Sandefjord Fotball players
Vejle Boldklub Kolding players
Alta IF players
IL Hødd players
Eliteserien players
Norwegian First Division players
Norwegian Second Division players
Norwegian Third Division players
Danish 1st Division players
Norwegian expatriate footballers
Expatriate men's footballers in Denmark
Norwegian expatriate sportspeople in Denmark
Steinkjer FK players
Norway under-21 international footballers
Association football forwards
Sportspeople from Trøndelag